is a fashion trend among young Japanese women that started in the mid-1990s, distinguished by a dark tan and contrasting make-up liberally applied by fashionistas.

The Shibuya and Ikebukuro districts of Tokyo were the centres of ganguro fashion; it was started by rebellious youth who contradicted the traditional Japanese concept of beauty; pale skin, dark hair and neutral makeup tones. Ganguro instead tanned their skin, bleached their hair and used colourful makeup in unusual ways.

Ganguro has a connection to Japanese folklore of ghosts and demons who are depicted with a similar appearance, such as those in kabuki and noh costumes. This connection is further underlined by the off-shoot style yamanba, named after a mountain witch in Japanese folklore.

The ganguro trend faded out afterwards, although its influence can be observed in yamanba and  styles.

Characteristics 

Ganguro appeared as a new fashion style in Japan in the mid-1990s and was prevalent mostly among young women. In ganguro fashion, a deep tan is combined with hair dyed in shades of red to blonde, or a silver grey known as "high bleached". Black ink is used as eyeliner and white concealer is used as lipstick and eyeshadow. False eyelashes, plastic facial gems, and pearl powder are often added to this. Platform shoes and brightly coloured outfits complete the ganguro look. Also typical of ganguro fashion are tie-dyed sarongs, miniskirts, stickers on the face, and many bracelets, rings, and necklaces.

Researchers in the field of Japanese studies believe that ganguro is a form of revenge against traditional Japanese society due to resentment of neglect, isolation, and constraint of Japanese society. This is their attempt at individuality, self-expression, and freedom, in open defiance of school standards and regulations.

Fashion magazines like Egg and Ageha have had a direct influence on the ganguro. Other popular ganguro magazines include Popteen and Ego System. The ganguro culture is often linked with para para, a Japanese dance style. However, most para para dancers are not ganguro, and most ganguro are not para para dancers, though there are many who are ganguro or gal and dance para para.

One of the most famous early ganguro girls was known as Buriteri, nicknamed after the black soy sauce used to flavor yellowtail fish in teriyaki cooking. Egg made her a star by frequently featuring her in its pages during the height of the ganguro craze. After modelling and advertising for the Shibuya tanning salon "Blacky", social pressure and negative press convinced Buriteri to retire from the ganguro lifestyle.

Yamanba and Manba  

 
Old school yamanba and manba (particularly known as 2004 Manba) featured dark tans and white lipstick, pastel eye makeup, tiny metallic or glittery adhesives below the eyes, brightly coloured circle lenses, plastic dayglo-coloured clothing, and incongruous accessories, such as Hawaiian leis. Stickers on the face died out shortly after 2004 and, for a while, yamanba died. Manba then became more extreme, with multicoloured and usually synthetic hair. Manba in 2008 saw a darker tan, and no facial stickers. Hair was usually neon/bright colours, with pink being a favourite. Wool emulating dreadlocks, extensions, and clips were worn to make hair appear longer. Clothing remained the same, although leis were worn less frequently.

Yamanba and manba are distinct from one another. Yamanba involves white make-up only above the eye, while manba makeup is applied below the eye also. Stuffed animals, bracelets, bells and hibiscus flowers are worn. The male equivalent is called a "Center guy", a pun on the name of a popular pedestrian shopping street near Shibuya Station in Tokyo called .

Etymology 
Ganguro practitioners say that the term derives from the phrase . The word  can be translated as "burn-black look", and "dark tanning".

The term  is derived from Yama-uba, the name of a mountain hag in Japanese folklore whom the fashion is thought to resemble.

See also 
 AV idol
 Burusera
 Cosplay restaurant
 Gals!
 Gyaru
 Host and hostess clubs
 JK business
 Kawaii
 Kogal
 Maid café
 Panchira
 Peach Girl
 Zettai ryōiki
Sun tanning

References

External links 
 The Ganguro Effect
 "British followers of Japanese fashion"—BBC World Service article

Japanese subcultures
Japanese fashion
Slang terms for women
Female stock characters in anime and manga
Gyaru